Masah refers to the act of ritually cleaning the head or feet with a small amount of water, running the wet hands over the head or feet before salat (Islamic prayer). The term shares the same root as the word Maseeh (Messiah) which is used for one who is anointed, in religious terms by God.

Masah of the head
Wet hands should be passed all over the head, with a deliberate stroke downwards from the top of the head; then index fingers are placed in ear canal while thumbs pass behind ears & lobes; then swipe back of hands over neck nape. This is done in one continuous motion, without refreshing the hands with water for  each component. Hands should not be passed around the fore-neck as it is prohibited. One may  make masah over a Muslim head cap, and wet hands must actually touch the head.

References

Ritual purity in Islam
Salah
Salah terminology